Alphaville may refer to:

Arts and entertainment
 Alphaville (film), a 1965 French science fiction film directed by Jean-Luc Godard
 Alphaville (band), a German music group
 "Alphaville", a song from Bryan Ferry's 2010 album Olympia
 Alphaville, a fictional city in The Sims Online game
 Alphaville, a fictional city in ALPH, a science fiction novel by Charles Eric Maine
 Alphaville Films, an American film production company whose films include The Mummy series
 FT Alphaville, a blog-style online publication of the Financial Times newspaper

Other uses
 Alphaville, São Paulo, a real estate and gated communities development in Brazil and Portugal

See also
 Lost in Alphaville, 2014 album by The Rentals